The 2016 Chicago Sky season was the franchise's 11th season in the Women's National Basketball Association (WNBA).

Transactions

WNBA Draft

Trades and Roster Changes

Roster
{| class="toccolours" style="font-size: 95%; width: 100%;"
|-
! colspan="2"  style="background:#4b90cc; color:#Fbb726"|2016 Chicago Sky Roster
|- style="text-align:center; background-color:#Fbb726; color:#FFFFFF;"
! Players !! Coaches
|-
| valign="top" |
{| class="sortable" style="background:transparent; margin:0px; width:100%;"
! Pos. !! # !! Nat. !! Name !! Ht. !! Wt. !! From
|-

Depth

Schedule

Preseason

|- bgcolor="bbffbb"
| 1 || May 1 || New York || W 93–59 || Elena Delle Donne (17) || Betnijah Laney (7) || Courtney Vandersloot (4) || Bob Carpenter Center3,432 || 1–0
|-  bgcolor="ffcccc"
| 2 || May 4 || Connecticut || L 84–81 || Elena Delle Donne (13) || Jessica Breland (6) || Jamierra Faulkner (5) || Mohegan Sun Arena4,207 || 1–1
|-  bgcolor="bbffbb"
| 3 || May 5 || Atlanta || W 95–75 || Betnijah Laney (14) || Cheyenne Parker (5) || Courtney Vandersloot (6) || Mohegan Sun Arena4,025 || 2–1
|-

Regular Season

|- bgcolor="bbffbb"
| 1 || May 14 || Connecticut || 93-70 || Courtney Vandersloot (14) || Jessica Breland (9) || Courtney Vandersloot (7) || Allstate Arena || 1-0
|- style="background:#fcc;"
| 2 || May 18 || Minnesota || 97-80 || Elena Delle Donne (28) || Delle DonneYoung (6) || Courtney Vandersloot (11)  || Allstate Arena || 1-1
|- style="background:#fcc;"
| 3 || May 22 || Atlanta ||  87-81 || Cappie Pondexter (17) || Jessica Breland (10)	|| Cappie Pondexter (5) || Philips Arena || 1-2
|- style="background:#fcc;"
| 4 || May 24 || Los Angeles || 93-80 || Jamierra Faulkner 17 || BrelandYoung (9) || Jamierra Faulkner (10) || Allstate Arena || 1-3
|- style="background:#fcc;"
| 5 || May 27|| San Antonio || 79-78 || Elena Delle Donne (27) || de SouzaDelle Donne (9) || Jamierra Faulkner (11) || AT&T Center ||1-4
|- bgcolor="bbffbb"
| 6 || May 29 || Dallas || 92-87 || Cappie Pondexter (18) || Imani Boyette (8) || Jamierra Faulkner (9) || College Park Center || 2-4
|-

|- bgcolor="bbffbb"
| 7 || June 16:00 PM || Washington || 86-78 || Delle Donne 18 || Delle Donne 9 || Vandersloot 8 || Verizon Center ||  3-4
|- bgcolor="bbffbb"
| 8 || June 37:30 PM || Washington || 98-72  ||Delle Donne 18  || de Souza 7|| Faulkner 9 || Allstate Arena || 4-4
|- bgcolor="bbffbb"
| 9 || June 106:00 PM|| Indiana ||  73-64 || Boyette 16 ||Boyette 12  || Vandersloot 6 || Bankers Life Fieldhouse || 5-4
|- style="background:#fcc;"
| 10 || June 125:00 PM || Phoenix || 86-80 || Delle Donne 18 || de Souza 7 || de Souza, Faulkner 3 || US Airways Center || 5-5
|- style="background:#fcc;"
| 11 || June 149:30 PM || Los Angeles || 98-85  || Pondexter 20 || de Souza 12 || Pondexter 5 || Staples Center ||5-6
|- style="background:#fcc;"
| 12 || June 176:30 PM || Atlanta || 101-97 OT  || Delle Donne 26 || de Souza 8 || Vandersloot, Pondexter, Faulkner 5 || Philips Arena || 5-7
|- bgcolor="bbffbb"
| 13 || June 217:00 PM || San Antonio || 81-75 || Delle Donne 23 || Young 9 || Faulkner, Young, Delle Donne 3 || Allstate Arena || 6-7
|- style="background:#fcc;"
| 14 || June 246:30 PM || New York || 80-79 || Delle Donne 31 || Delle Donne 8 || Vandersloot 5 || Madison Square Garden || 6-8
|- style="background:#fcc;"
| 15 || June 2911:30 AM || Indiana || 95-83 || Delle Donne 21 || Delle Donne 6 || Pondexter 6 || Allstate Arena || 6-9

|- bgcolor="bbffbb"
| 16 || July 16:00 PM || Washington || 86-84 OT || Delle Donne 28 || Delle Donne 11 || Vandersloot 5 || Allstate Arena ||  7-9
|- style="background:#fcc;"
| 17 || July 57:30 PM || Washington ||  87-82 || Delle Donne 38 || Delle Donne 10 || Faulkner 7 || Target Center || 7-10
|- style="background:#fcc;"
| 18 || July 87:30 PM || New York || 88-85 || Quigley 29||  Delle Donne 7 || Faulkner 5 || Allstate Arena || 7-11
|- bgcolor="bbffbb"
| 19 || July 106:00 PM|| Phoenix ||  100-95 || Quigley 21 || Boyette 13 || Vandersloot, Faulkner 7 || Allstate Arena || 8-11
|- style="background:#fcc;"
| 20 || July 135:00 PM || Los Angeles || 77-67 || Delle Donne 15 || Boyette 7 || Vandersloot, Faulkner 5 || Allstate Arena || 8-12
|- bgcolor="bbffbb"
| 21 || July 149:30 PM || Los Angeles ||  84-77 || Delle Donne 24 || Boyette 8 || Faulkner 6 || Allstate Arena ||9-12
|- bgcolor="bbffbb"
| 22 || July 176:30 PM || Seattle || 91-88 || Delle Donne 35 || Delle Donne 11 || Faulkner 4 || KeyArena || 10-12
|- bgcolor="bbffbb"
| 23 || July 197:00 PM || Phoenix || 79-77 || Delle Donne 18 || Boyette 10 || Vandersloot 3 || Talking Stick Resort Arena || 11-12
|- style="background:#fcc;"
| 24 || July 226:30 PM || Connecticut || 94-89 || Delle Donne 20 || Breland 8 || Vandersloot 6 || Allstate Arena || 11-13

|- bgcolor="bbffbb"
| 25 || August 2611:30 AM || Atlanta || 90-82 || Delle Donne 34 || Boyette 9||Delle Donne, Pondexter 5  || Allstate Arena || 12-13
|- bgcolor="bbffbb"
| 26 || August 2811:30 AM || Dallas ||92-85  ||Delle Donne 18 || Delle Donne 9 ||Vandersloot 9  || College Park Center || 13-13

|- bgcolor="bbffbb"
| 27 || September 211:30 AM || Seattle || 92-88 || Young 24 || Breland 10||Vandersloot, Pondexter 5  || Allstate Arena || 14-13
|- bgcolor="bbffbb"
| 28 || September 411:30 AM || San Antonio || 97-73 || Delle Donne 35 || Boyette 7||Vandersloot, Pondexter 5  || Allstate Arena || 15-13
|- style="background:#fcc;"
| 29 || September 76:00 PM|| Washington || 118-81 || Vandersloot 17 || Boyette 7 || Vandersloot 8 || Verizon Center || 15-14
|- style="background:#fcc;"
| 30 || September 95:00 PM || Los Angeles || 95-88 || Pondexter 22 || Breland 9 || Vandersloot 4 ||Bankers Life Fieldhouse || 15-15
|- bgcolor="bbffbb"
| 31 || September 119:30 PM || Los Angeles || 96-86 || Pondexter 24 || Breland 10 || Pondexter 5 || Mohegan Sun Arena ||16-15
|- bgcolor="bbffbb"
|32 || September 136:30 PM || Minnesota || 98-97 OT || Pondexter 24 || de Souza 11 || Pondexter 4 || Allstate Arena || 17-15
|- bgcolor="bbffbb"
| 33 ||September 177:00 PM || New York || 92-68 || Young 22 || Young 9 || Faulkner 11 || Allstate Arena || 18-15
|- style="background:#fcc;"
|34 ||  September 196:30 PM || Seattle || 88-75 || Faulkner, Breland 14 || Boyette, de Souza 6 ||  Faulkner 7|| KeyArena || 18-16

Standings

Playoffs
The Sky's 18–16 regular season record was good for second in the Eastern Conference and fourth overall in the WNBA.  This standing led to Chicago being seeded fourth and being granted an automatic bye from the first of two single elimination rounds.  In the second single elimination round, the Sky drew sixth-seeded Atlanta, defeating the Dream 108–98 and advancing to the best-of-five semifinal round.  The Sky fell to second-seeded Los Angeles in the semifinals, losing in four games.

References

Footnotes

Notes

Chicago Sky seasons
Chicago
2016 in sports in Illinois